Jeletzkya douglassae is a fossil coleoid from the early Pennsylvanian Mazon Creek lagerstätten and represents the earliest known crown-group squid. Non-mineralized anatomy is preserved and comprises ten hooked tentacles and a radula. It is too poorly understood for assignment to any particular cephalopod taxon.

References

Carboniferous cephalopods
Cephalopod genera
Carboniferous animals of North America